ChromaGun is a first-person shooter puzzle video game developed by Pixel Maniacs, an independent game studio from Germany.

Gameplay

ChromaGun is a puzzle game revolving around using colors. The player uses the ChromaGun, a paint-shooting weapon, to colorize walls and floating spherical robots, called Worker Droids. These Worker Droids are attracted to walls of the same color and will move towards them.

The player's objective is to solve puzzles by cleverly rearranging Worker Droids, changing their colors, and guiding them to door-opening triggers, switches or electrified tiles. The player can shoot paint in the primary colors red, blue and yellow using the ChromaGun. The primary colors can be mixed together on walls and Worker Droids to create the secondary colors green, purple and orange. Mixing more than two different colors will result in black, which Worker Droids are not attracted to.

The game consists of many short puzzle levels to solve, however a single mistake can render a puzzle unsolvable, forcing to restart the level. There are 26 levels in total, each with only one solution.

Reception
On Metacritic, the Nintendo Switch version has a score of 69/100 based on 14 reviews, and the PlayStation 4 version has a score of 74/100 based on 10 reviews. indicating "mixed or average reviews". 

Twinfinite's Chaz Miller scored it 3.5/5, praising the game's art direction, difficulty and concept, but stated that the puzzles could get "frustrating" or "repetitive" in portions, and had no alternative solutions.

See also
 Portal
 Portal 2
 Q.U.B.E.

References

External links
 ChromaGun at MobyGames

2015 video games
Video games developed in Germany
First-person shooters
Puzzle video games
Linux games
MacOS games
Windows games
PlayStation 4 games
Xbox One games
Oculus Rift games
Steam Greenlight games
Nintendo Switch games